The Mercey Brothers were a Canadian country music group active from 1957 to 1989. The brothers were seven-time Juno Award winners for "The Top Country Group" and were inducted into the Canadian Country Music Hall of Fame.

Early life
All three Mercey brothers were born in Hanover, a small town south of Owen Sound, Ontario. Larry Mercey, the eldest of three, was born on December 12, 1939; Ray was born on November 21, 1940, and Lloyd, the youngest, was born on December 12, 1945.

The Mercey family grew up to music in their household at an early age. Larry Mercey sang on the radio station CKNX Barn Dance in 1956, in the neighbouring town of Wingham, Ontario.

Band history

Formation
Larry and Ray formed a country music group in 1957, singing and playing the guitar (Larry) and bass (Ray).  They called their group The Mercey Brothers and patterned their music and their image to resemble the Everly Brothers, a harmony duo popular in the United States at the time.

Larry and Ray placed second in CBC Television's Talent Caravan in 1960 and later went on to sign with Chateau Records in 1961. They made their first chart appearance with "Just the Snap of Your Fingers" that same year.

Trio
Lloyd Mercey joined the group as a singer and drummer in 1966 when he was twenty years old, and together they called themselves The Mercey Brothers.  After signing with Columbia Records, they released four RPM chart-topping singles, including "Whistling on the River". In 1968, they released the singles "Uncle Tom", "What’s a Guy to Do?", and "The Great Snowman" under their self-titled album The Mercey Brothers.

Singles "Who Drinks My Beer When I’m Gone" and "Ordinary Peeping Tom" came out under albums titled My Song For You (Columbia) and The Mercey Brothers (Harmony) in 1969.

The Mercey Brothers signed with RCA Records in 1970 and released a string of singles which received radio play. At the 1970 Juno Awards, they were named "Best Country Group or Duo". They went on to win this award for the next four years in a row (1970–1974), and again in 1976.

In 1971, The Mercey Brothers toured England for the first time and made an appearance on BBC television. Their hit singles on the RCA album Have Mercey, were "Hello Mom" and "Who Wrote the Words". They also hosted a television show, The Mercey Brothers Show.

In 2021, Larry Mercey wrote a book titled Have Mercy: My First 60 Years Making Music in which one of his recollections is the band's first dates played in Saulte Ste Marie, Ontario.

Lineup changes
Ray Mercey left the band in 1980 to spend more time with his family. To fill in for Ray's absence, the others brought in bass player Gord Ogilvie and lead guitar Darrell Scott. Over the next few years, artists Dann Peer, Gord Heins, John Dymond, and Eric Mahar filled in for the band. In 1989 the Mercey Brothers disbanded; they were inducted into the Canadian Country Music Hall of Fame that same year.

Mercey Brothers sound
In 1973, The Mercey Brothers opened their own recording studio called Mercey Brothers Recording Studio.  That gave them more control over their music and general sound of the band. Their studio was in Elmira, Ontario between 1973 and 1980. They also started their own Record Label, MBS (Mercey Brothers Sound) during this period. MBS signed on names such as Terry Carisse, Marie Bottrell and Joan Kennedy.

Discography

Albums

Singles

References

External links
 
 
 Entry at thecanadianencyclopedia.ca

Canadian country music groups
Juno Award winners
Musical groups established in 1957
Musical groups disestablished in 1989
Musical groups from Ontario
1957 establishments in Ontario
1989 disestablishments in Ontario
Canadian Country Music Association Group of the Year winners